Clay Patterson is an American football coach who serves as the tight ends coach for the University of South Florida Bulls.

College years 
Patterson first played college football as a wide receiver at Northeastern Oklahoma A&M before transferring and finishing his career at Southeastern Oklahoma State.

Coaching career 
Patterson began his coaching career as the wide receivers coach at his alma mater of Southeastern Oklahoma State. He had stints at Tarleton State, Texas A&M Kingsville and Trinity Valley Community College before being hired as the head coach at Northeastern Oklahoma A&M. In 2018 he was hired by P.J. Fleck to be the tight ends coach for the University of Minnesota. In 2022, Patterson was hired as the tight ends coach and pass game coordinator at Colorado. Following an 0-5 start to the 2022 season, Colorado fired head coach Karl Dorell and named offensive coordinator Mike Sanford the interim head coach, and Sanford promoted Patterson to the open offensive coordinator position.

References

External links 

 Colorado profile

Living people
Colorado Buffaloes football coaches
Minnesota Golden Gophers football coaches
Coaches of American football from Oklahoma
People from Morris, Oklahoma
Year of birth missing (living people)